Jan Joseph "Joep" Packbiers (19 January 1875 – 8 December 1957) was an archer from the Netherlands. He was born in Nuth, Limburg and died in Maastricht, Limburg.

He represented his native country at the 1920 Summer Olympics in Antwerp, Belgium. There he won the gold medal in the Men's Team Event (28 m), alongside Piet de Brouwer, Janus Theeuwes, Driekske van Bussel, Jo van Gastel, Tiest van Gestel, Janus van Merrienboer, and Theo Willems.

References

External links
 profile
 Dutch Olympic Committee 

1875 births
1957 deaths
Archers at the 1920 Summer Olympics
Dutch male archers
Olympic archers of the Netherlands
Olympic gold medalists for the Netherlands
Olympic medalists in archery
People from Nuth
Medalists at the 1920 Summer Olympics
Sportspeople from Limburg (Netherlands)